Lavasan-e Kuchak Rural District is in Lavasanat District of Shemiranat County, Tehran province, Iran. At the National Census of 2006, its population was 2,968 in 859 households. There were 5,918 inhabitants in 1,946 households at the following census of 2011. At the most recent census of 2016, the population of the rural district was 5,680 in 1,963 households. The largest of its 27 villages was Afjeh, with 1,257 people.

References 

Shemiranat County

Rural Districts of Tehran Province

Populated places in Tehran Province

Populated places in Shemiranat County